Samad Khan Momtaz os-Saltaneh, or Momtaz ol Saltaneh (1869–26 March 1954) (in Persian : صمد خان ممتاز السطنه) was an Iranian diplomat of the Qajar and Pahlavi dynasty era.

Early life
Samad Khan Momtaz was born in 1869 in Tabriz. His father was Ali Akbar Mokrem os-Saltaneh (in Persian: میرزا علی اکبر مکرم‌ السلطنه), grandson of Samad Khan Sarraf (in Persian:  آقا صمد صراف تبریزی) and his brothers were Momtaz Homayoun and Esmail Momtaz od-Dowleh, His father was an eminent aristocrat and diplomat.

Career
In 1883, Samad Khan Momtaz os-Saltaneh was secretary to the legation of Persia in Paris. Later, he was embassy counsellor in St. Petersburg and participated in the European travels of Naser al-Din Shah Qajar and then Mozaffar ad-Din Shah Qajar. He was the Persian minister in Belgium and the Netherlands before being appointed Extraordinary and Plenipotentiary Minister in Paris in April 1905. He remained at this position until March 1926. He never returned to Iran and chose to live in Paris. He was recognized by the French government as counsellor of the Iranian embassy in Paris from 25 March 1946 to 27 September 1951. Samad Khan Momtaz os-saltaneh, was the second Persian IOC (International Olympic Committee) Member. His date of appointment was November 1923, and he remained a member until 22 April 1927, after the coronation of Reza Shah Pahlavi. At the conference of the International Red Cross of 1906, Momtaz os-Saltaneh wins to convince the assembly to accept the use of new emblems; The Red-Lion and Sun for Persia (no used since the 1979 Islamic revolution) and the Red Crescent for the rest of Islamic states.

Personal life
His first marriage, to an Iranian, resulted in a son, Abdollah, who would later become a diplomat in Iran. He had two daughters from a second marriage to a Frenchwoman. He died in 1954 in Paris and was buried at Père-Lachaise cemetery. In March 1921, Samad Khan was elevated to Prince by Ahmad Shah Qajar with the title of Royal Highness. He was a Grand Officier de la Légion d'honneur.

Photos

References

External links 

 

1955 deaths
1869 births
People from Tabriz
Ambassadors of Iran to France
Grand Officiers of the Légion d'honneur
Burials at Père Lachaise Cemetery
Iranian diplomats
Iranian emigrants to France
Grand Crosses of the Order of Saint-Charles
People of Qajar Iran
19th-century Iranian people
20th-century Iranian people
People of Pahlavi Iran